The Robert Award for Best American Film is an award presented by the Danish Film Academy at the annual Robert Awards ceremony.

History 
The award has been handed out since 1999. Between 1984 and 1996, a Robert Award for Best Foreign Film was handed out. Since 1997 a Robert Award for Best Non-American Film has been handed out as well.

Honorees

1990s 
 1999: The Truman Show – Peter Weir

2000s 
 2000: The Straight Story – David Lynch
 2001: American Beauty – Sam Mendes
 2002: The Lord of the Rings: The Fellowship of the Ring – Peter Jackson
 2003: Gosford Park – Robert Altman
 2004: The Hours – Stephen Daldry
 2005: Lost in Translation – Sofia Coppola
 2006: Sideways – Alexander Payne
 2007: Babel – Alejandro González Iñárritu
 2008: Not awarded
 2009: No Country for Old Men – Joel Coen and Ethan Coen

2010s 
 2010: Up – Pete Docter
 2011: Inception – Christopher Nolan
 2012: Drive – Nicolas Winding Refn
 2013: Argo – Ben Affleck
 2014: Gravity – Alfonso Cuarón
 2015: Boyhood – Richard Linklater
 2016: Birdman – Alejandro G. Iñárritu
 2017: The Revenant – Alejandro G. Iñárritu
 2018: Manchester by the Sea – Kenneth Lonergan
 2019: Three Billboards – Martin McDonagh

2020s 
 2020: Joker – Todd Phillips
 2021: Nomadland - Chloe Zhao

Directors with multiple wins 
Alejandro G. Iñárritu - 3

See also 

 Bodil Award for Best American Film
 Academy Award for Best Picture

References

External links 
  

1999 establishments in Denmark
Awards established in 1999
Awards for best film
American Film